Alfredo Luis Peel Yates was an English-born, Argentine international footballer who made four appearances for the Argentina national team in 1911.

References

External links
 
 

Year of birth missing
Year of death missing
Association football midfielders
Argentine footballers
Argentina international footballers
English emigrants to Argentina